Lieuwe Steiger (born in Haarlem, 15 April 1924 – died in Eindhoven, 17 October 2006) was a Dutch football goalkeeper.

He played 383 Eredivisie matches with PSV Eindhoven (1942-1957, 1959), playing also for the Netherlands national football team in 1953-54. In the European Cup 1955–56 he played PSV first round matches against SK Rapid Wien. He died aged 82 years old.

External links
Profile at Voetbal International

1924 births
2006 deaths
Dutch footballers
Netherlands international footballers
Association football goalkeepers
PSV Eindhoven players
Footballers from Haarlem